Eukaryotic translation initiation factor 2-alpha kinase 4 is an enzyme that in humans is encoded by the EIF2AK4 gene.

EIF2AK4 belongs to a family of kinases that phosphorylate the alpha subunit of eukaryotic translation initiation factor-2 (EIF2S1; MIM 603907) to downregulate protein synthesis in response to varied cellular stresses (Berlanga et al., 1999).[supplied by OMIM]

See also 
 Gcn2

References

Further reading

External links 
 

EC 2.7.11